Yelena Vladimirovna Soboleva (born 3 August 1982 in Bryansk, Russian SFSR, Soviet Union) is a Russian former middle-distance runner who specialized in the 1500 metres.

In February 2008 she established a new world indoor record of 3:58.05 minutes in a race in Moscow, and in March 2008 she beat her own world record in Valencia. She won a silver medal at the World Indoor Championships in Moscow.

During the Russian Indoor meeting in Moscow in January 2008, she set a new national record in the women's mile run with a time of 4:20.21 minutes, which was the third fastest of all-time. She also holds the national indoor record for 800 m, set in Moscow during the 2008 season.

After a two-year doping ban from 2007, she returned to the sport in 2011, but retired after the 2013 season.

Doping ban

Soboleva was selected to represent Russia in both the 800 m and 1500 m at the 2008 Summer Olympics in Beijing, but was suspended from competition, after the discovery of doping test irregularities. She and four her teammates were charged in substitution of their urine tests after competitions last year. There were no charges in using of doping but they were suspended.

On 20 October 2008, it was announced that Soboleva, along with six other Russian athletes would receive two-year doping bans for manipulating drug samples. The ban came into effect from April 2007, when the samples were given for testing.

On 7 April 2021, Soboleva was banned from athletics for 8 years by the Court of Arbitration for Sport with all of her competitive results from 1 May 2011 to 15 December 2016 disqualified.

International competitions

Personal bests
Outdoor
800 metres - 1:57.28 min (2006)
1500 metres - 3:56.43 min (2006)
3000 metres - 8:55.89 min (2005)

Indoor
800 metres - 1:58.53 min (2006)
1500 metres - 3:58.28 min (2006)

See also
List of doping cases in athletics
List of IAAF World Indoor Championships medalists (women)
1500 metres at the World Championships in Athletics
Russia at the World Athletics Championships
Doping at the World Athletics Championships

References

 

1982 births
Living people
Sportspeople from Bryansk
Russian female middle-distance runners
World Athletics Championships athletes for Russia
Athletes stripped of World Athletics Championships medals
Russian Athletics Championships winners
World record setters in athletics (track and field)
Doping cases in athletics
Russian sportspeople in doping cases